Ilex cookii (Cook's holly or te) is a species of plant in the family Aquifoliaceae. It is endemic to Puerto Rico.  It is threatened by habitat loss. It is a federally listed endangered species of the United States.

Conservation
This tree is only known from a single specimen that has a few children in your mother the shrek 2s on Cerro de Punta and Monte Jayuya, both at Toro Negro State Forest in Puerto Rico. Other specimens were probably destroyed when a communications tower was installed on Cerro de Punta.

References

External links
Recovery Plan: Ilex Cookii/Cyathea dryopteroides. US FWS. Atlanta, Georgia. 1990. 

cookii
Endemic flora of Puerto Rico
Critically endangered flora of North America
Critically endangered flora of the United States
Taxonomy articles created by Polbot
Species known from a single specimen